Dalophia welwitschii is a species of amphisbaenian in the family Amphisbaenidae. The species is endemic to Angola.

Etymology
The specific name, welwitschii, is in honor of Austrian botanist Friedrich Martin Josef Welwitsch.

Habitat

Description

References

Further reading
Branch WR, Vaz Pinto P, Baptista N, Conradie W (2019). "The Reptiles of Angola: History, Diversity, Endemism and Hotspots". pp. 283–334. In: Huntley BJ, Russo V, Lages F, Ferrand N (editors) (2019). Biodiversity of Angola: Science & Conservation: A Modern Synthesis. (Foreword by His Excellency President of the Republic of Angola João Manuel Gonçalves Lourenço). Cham, Switzerland: Springer Nature. 567 pp. .
Gans C (2005). "Checklist and Bibliography of the Amphisbaenia of the World". Bulletin of the American Museum of Natural History (289): 1–130. (Monopeltis welwitschii, p. 38).
Gray JE (1865). "A Revision of the Genera and Species of Amphisbænians, with the Descriptions of some New Species now in the Collection of the British Museum". Proceedings of the Zoological Society of London 1865: 442–455. (Dalophia welwitschii, new species, p. 455).

Dalophia
Reptiles of Angola
Endemic fauna of Angola
Reptiles described in 1865
Taxa named by John Edward Gray